Jeremy Leonel Sarmiento Morante (born 16 June 2002) is a professional footballer who plays as a winger for Premier League club Brighton & Hove Albion and the Ecuador national team. Born in Spain to Ecuadorian parents, he represented England at youth international level before making his senior Ecuador debut in October 2021.

Club career

Brighton & Hove Albion

2021–22: Breakthrough into senior team
A youth product of Charlton Athletic and Benfica, Sarmiento signed for the academy of Premier League side Brighton & Hove Albion on 2 July 2021. He made his professional career debut on 22 September, coming on as a 69th-minute substitute for injured Alexis Mac Allister in the 2–0 home victory over Swansea City in the third round of the EFL Cup. Sarmiento made a Premier League matchday squad for the first time on 2 October, remaining as an unused substitute in the 0–0 home draw against Arsenal. Sarmiento made his first start for The Seagulls on 27 October, playing 69 minutes of the eventual penalty shootout loss away at Leicester City in the EFL Cup. He made his Premier League debut on 27 November, coming on as an 82nd-minute substitute replacing Jakub Moder in the goalless draw at home against Leeds United. Sarmiento made his first Premier League start four days later, where he ultimately played just 13 minutes due to an injury in which he was replaced, in the eventual 1–1 away draw at West Ham. It was revealed his injury, which was to the hamstring, would require an operation with Brighton boss Graham Potter hinting he would be back towards the end of February 2022. On 31 January 2022, he signed a new contract, committing a long-term future with Brighton signing on until June 2026. Sarmiento made his return to the matchday squad remaining as an unused substitute in the 2–0 home loss against Tottenham Hotspur on 16 March. He made his first appearance since his injury on 2 April, coming on as an 88th-minute substitute in the 0–0 home draw against bottom side Norwich City. Sarmiento replaced Moder who was subbed on five minutes previously but picked up an injury himself. At Albions end of season awards in May, Sarmiento won the Young Player of the Season thanking everyone for his support adding, "My first season and making my Premier League debut were really special and I am honoured to win this award."

2022–23

Sarmiento made his first Premier League start of the season on 3 January 2023, where he helped set up Evan Ferguson's goal in the 4–1 away win over Everton. On 4 February, Sarmiento came on from the bench and later assisted Kaoru Mitoma's 87th minite winner, the only goal of the game in the victory over Bournemouth.

International career

Youth career

With England 
Sarmiento was born in Spain to Ecuadorian parents, and moved to England at the age of 7. He is a youth international for England and represented them at the 2019 UEFA European Under-17 Championship. In October 2019 Sarmiento scored the winning goal for England under-18 in a 3–2 victory away to Austria.

Senior career

Pledge with Ecuador and 2022 FIFA World Cup

Sarmiento was called up for the Ecuador national team for the first time in October 2021 for 2022 World Cup qualifiers against Bolivia, Venezuela and Colombia. He debuted in a 3–0 win over Bolivia on 7 October 2021.

On 14 November, Sarmiento was named in Ecuador's 26-man squad for the 2022 FIFA World Cup alongside Brighton teammates Pervis Estupiñán and Moisés Caicedo.

Career statistics
Club

International

HonoursIndividual'
Brighton & Hove Albion Young Player of the Season: 2021–22

References

External links

Brighton and Hove Albion Profile

2002 births
Living people
Footballers from Madrid
Ecuadorian footballers
English footballers
Association football wingers
Brighton & Hove Albion F.C. players
Premier League players
England youth international footballers
Ecuador international footballers
2022 FIFA World Cup players